Wang Xun may refer to:

Wang Xun (calligrapher) (349–400), Jin dynasty calligrapher
Wang Zhongsi (704–748), Tang dynasty general, birth name Wang Xun
Wang Xun (actor) (born 1974), Chinese actor
Wang Xun (pianist) (born 1979), Chinese pianist